This is a list of urban areas in Finland by population, with the 100 largest localities or urban areas in Finland on 31 December 2019. The list is based on data from Statistics Finland that defines an urban area as a cluster of dwellings with at least 200 inhabitants.

See also 

 Urban areas in Finland
 List of cities and towns in Finland
 List of Finnish municipalities by population
 List of urban areas in the Nordic countries

References 

Finland
Cities and towns in Finland
Finland
Urb